The following is a list of 456 extrasolar planets that were only detected by radial velocity method –– 31 confirmed and 323 candidates, sorted by orbital periods. Since none of these planets are transiting or directly observed, they do not have measured radii and generally their masses are only minimum. The true masses can be determined when astrometry calculates the inclination of the orbit.

There are 160 members of the multi-planet systems –– 21 confirmed and 139 candidates.

List of confirmed extrasolar planets
The most massive confirmed exoplanet is Iota Draconis b, which masses 9.40 MJ (i.e. 9.4 times the mass of Jupiter); the least massive confirmed planet is Gliese 581 e, which masses 0.007906 MJ or 2.51 M🜨.  The longest period of any confirmed exoplanet is 55 Cancri d, which takes 5169 days or 14.15 years to make one trip around the star; the shortest period is Gliese 876 d, which takes just 1.938 days or 46.5 hours to orbit the star.

Yellow rows denote the members of a multi-planet system

List of extrasolar planet candidates
The most massive exoplanet candidate is HD 217786 b, which masses 12.98 MJ; the least massive confirmed planet is HD 10180 b, which masses 0.004 MJ or 3.1 M🜨.  The longest period of any confirmed exoplanet is 47 Ursae Majoris d, which takes 14002 days or 38.33 years to make one trip around the star; the shortest period is HD 156668 b, which takes just 1.26984 days or 31.162 hours to orbit the star.

Yellow rows denote the members of a multi-planet system

External links 
 
 

 
Detected by radial velocity